Ittoqqortoormiit (West Greenlandic: Illoqqortoormiut ), formerly known as Scoresbysund, is a settlement in the Sermersooq municipality in eastern Greenland. Its population was 345 as of 2020 and has been described as one of the most remote settlements on earth.

The former name Scoresbysund derives from the English Arctic explorer and whaler William Scoresby, who was the first European to map the area in 1822. The name "Ittoqqortoormiit" means "Big-House Dwellers" in the Eastern Greenlandic dialect. The region is known for its wildlife, including polar bears, muskoxen, and seals.

Geography 
Ittoqqortoormiit is located on Liverpool Land, east of Hurry Inlet near the mouth of the northern shore of the Kangertittivaq fjord, which empties into the Greenland Sea.

The time zone in Ittoqqortoormiit is UTC-01:00, putting it one hour behind Iceland (during summer time same as Iceland), and two hours ahead of most of Greenland's population.

History

Ittoqqortoormiit was founded in 1925 by Ejnar Mikkelsen and some 80 Inuit settlers (70 persons from Tasiilaq and four families from western Greenland).

The settlement was encouraged by the colonial power Denmark which at the time had a growing interest in Northeast Greenland. At the same time, the colonization was intended to improve declining living conditions in Tasiilaq, from where the settlers were more or less voluntarily transferred. The settlers soon prospered on the good hunting conditions of the new area, which was rich in seals, walruses, narwhals, polar bears and Arctic foxes.

Before that, the area itself had been home to a dense population of Inuit in the past, as testified by ruins and other archeological remains.

Ittoqqortoormiit Municipality was a former municipality of Greenland. It is now part of Sermersooq Municipality.

Transport 

Ittoqqortoormiit is one of the most remote towns in Greenland. It is served by Ittoqqortoormiit Heliport, with Air Greenland helicopters shuttling passengers between the settlement and Nerlerit Inaat Airport ( distance), with boat transfer also possible for a few months a year. There are two Norlandair weekly departures from Reykjavík Domestic Airport and Akureyri to Nerlerit Inaat. As of 2022, Air Greenland no longer has weekly flights from Kangerlussuaq and Nuuk.

Economy

Local hunters have made a living from whale and polar bear hunting for generations, and it remains, up to the present, a significant cultural-economical factor in the area. Meat and by-products play a direct part in the economy of the hunting families. Income is gained by trading these products, but these options are seasonal and variable.

Ittoqqortoormiit lies near large populations of shrimp and Greenland halibut, but the presence of sea ice prevents the exploitation of these resources year-round, and as a result fishing has never been extensively developed in the municipality.

Tourism, on the other hand, is growing in importance because it is of interest to researchers and extreme Arctic expeditions on land and by sea. Ittoqqortoormiit is the closest town in Greenland from Iceland and its ecosystem, hunting culture and remoteness are of interest to a growing number of travelers primarily from Europe. A local company, Nanu Travel, owns the only guest house in the settlement and arranges tours and expedition logistics for visitors. The Guest House was featured in the hotels.com #RemoteAF campaign in 2018 because of its status as the one of the most remote hotels on earth. The buildings at the abandoned Uunarteq settlement, also known as Kap Tobin, are used by the local inhabitants as cottages all year.

International relations

Twin towns – Sister cities
Ittoqqortoormiit is twinned with:
 Aalborg, Denmark

Climate

Ittoqqortoormiit features a tundra climate (Köppen ET) with bitterly cold winters, chilly summers and no monthly average even close to the  threshold that would allow tree growth. This coupled with an average annual temperature of  makes Ittoqqortoormiit one of the coldest permanently inhabited locations on Earth.

In the afternoon of 22 February 2005, the time of year that is normally the coldest, the temperature in the village briefly reached  due to a combination of exceptionally warm airmass and a strong foehn effect.

Population 
The population of Ittoqqortoormiit has fluctuated over the past three decades, decreasing about 35% since 2006.

Ittoqqortoormiit population dynamics. 1991–2020. Source: Statistics Greenland

References

Populated places in Greenland
Populated places established in 1925
Populated places of Arctic Greenland
Scoresby Sound
1925 establishments in North America
20th-century establishments in Greenland